The Manchester Football League is a football league in England, affiliated with Manchester FA, covering a 30-mile radius from Manchester Town Hall. It was formed in 1893, although play ceased between 1912 and 1920. Currently it consists of five divisions, with the Premier division being at level 11 of the English football league system.

Structure
The League consists of five divisions, from Premier Division to Division four. The Premier Division, Division One and Division Two can incorporate both first teams, and reserve teams of clubs who are playing at a higher level, while Divisions Three and Four usually consist entirely of reserve or lower teams.

However, for the 2018–19 season only, the constitution was amended to allow a small number of reserve teams into the bottom division of the first teams (Division Two) to even up the numbers. This was put in place in the hope of keeping all teams playing regularly as opposed to the old structure which meant teams could go without a fixture for a few weeks at a time.

The Premier Division has a promotion and relegation arrangement with the North West Counties Football League (NWCFL), placing it at level 11 of the English football league system. However, the NWCFL's ground requirements are considerably higher than those of the Manchester League, so meeting them usually requires expensive improvements, and consequently few teams take up the opportunity of promotion. Ashton Athletic took the step up in 2006, despite only finishing 4th in Division One. Teams such as Salford City, Maine Road and Northern Nomads have all played in the league at some point. The latest teams to make the step up were Prestwich Heys, Avro and most recently Stockport Georgians.

Teams from the Premier Division are relegated to Division One, making Division One the twelfth level of the English league system. However, first teams from Division One could be relegated to Division Two after the realignment of the league structure at the start of the 2017–18 season.

Following the introduction of the Coronavirus pandemic (COVID-19) national lockdown restrictions in March 2020, the 2019/20 season was unable to be completed and was therefore declared null and void. The following season suffered the same outcome with only around a third of fixtures being completed.

Current member clubs (2022–23)

Premier Division

Atherton Town
Bolton County
Chadderton Reserves
Dukinfield Town
Heyside
Heywood St James
Hindsford
Manchester Gregorians
Moorside Rangers
Old Altrinchamians
Pennington
Rochdale Sacred Heart
Royton Town
Springhead
Uppermill
Walshaw Sports

Division One

Altrincham Hale
Avenue
Avro Reserves
Bolton Borough
Bolton Lads & Girls Club
Bolton United
Boothstown
East Manchester
Elton Vale
Govan Athletic
Hindley Juniors
Manchester Central
Tintwistle Athletic
Wilmslow Albion

Division Two

Ashton Athletic Reserves
Astley & Tyldesley
Baguley Athletic
Breightmet United
Cavaliers
Chadderton Cott
De La Salle
Eccles United
Hollinwood
Horwich RMI
Leigh Genesis
Stockport Georgians Reserves
Tottington United

Recent champions of Premier Division, Division One & Division Two

External links

Manchester Football League at FA Full-Time

 
1893 establishments in England
Football in Greater Manchester
Football leagues in England
Sports leagues established in 1893